Kuroshabad (also Romanized as Kūroshābād, Koorosh Abad, and Kūreshābād) is a village in Shurab Rural District, in the Central District of Arsanjan County, Fars Province, Iran. At the 2006 census, its population was 96, in 27 families.

References 

Populated places in Arsanjan County